Living Ornaments '79 (1981) is a live album by British musician Gary Numan recorded at the Hammersmith Odeon on 28 September 1979. It was also released as a limited edition box set with Living Ornaments '80 (1981). An expanded (21-track) version was reissued on a double CD in 1998 before a remastered version was again reissued in 2005. The nine tracks of the original Living Ornaments '79 were included on 1979: The Live EPs, a disc available to those who bought the expanded, 2-disc version of The Pleasure Principle from Numan's website in 2009.

Living Ornaments '79 is one of two official live albums from Numan's 1979-1980 tour (billed as "The Touring Principle"), and is a record of the tour's first leg. In 2008, Numan's record label released Engineers, recorded during the tour's final leg (May 1980).

Track listing
All songs written by Gary Numan except where noted.

Original version

Side one
"Airlane" – 3:12
"Cars" – 3:20
"We Are So Fragile" – 2:33
"Films" – 3:45
"Something's in the House" – 4:08

Side two
"My Shadow in Vain" – 2:50
"Conversation" – 7:45
"The Dream Police" – 4:12
"Metal" – 3:25

Remastered version

Disc one
"Intro" – 2.32
"Airlane" – 3.07
"Me! I Disconnect From You" – 3.02
"Cars" – 3.25
"M.E." – 4.42
"You Are in My Vision" – 3.11
"Somethings in the House" – 3.55
"Random" – 3.38
"Everyday I Die" – 3.36
"Conversation" – 7.51
"We Are So Fragile" – 2.46

Disc two
"Bombers" – 5.30
"Remember I Was Vapour" – 4.51
"On Broadway" (Barry Mann, Cynthia Weil, Jerry Leiber, Mike Stoller) – 4.38
"The Dream Police" – 4.19
"Films" – 3.49
"Metal" – 3.25
"Down in the Park" – 5.38
"My Shadow in Vain" – 2.34
"Are 'Friends' Electric?" – 5.33
"Tracks" – 3.10

Personnel
Gary Numan – vocals, producer
Billy Currie – keyboards
Cedric Sharpley – drums
Chris Payne – keyboards, viola
Paul Gardiner – bass
Rrussell Bell – guitar, percussion, keyboards
Tim Summerhayes – engineer, remix
Phil Thornalley – assistant engineer
John Dent – digitally master
Peter Gilbert – photographer
Robert Ellis – photographer

Charts
Original album #47 (UK Albums Chart)
Living Ornaments '79 and '80 box set #2 (UK Albums Chart)

The Touring Principle video
In 1980, an edited version of the 28 September 1979 concert was released on video under the title The Touring Principle '79 and "special video effects" of the time were added to the recording. The songs featured on the video were "Me! I Disconnect From You", "M.E.", "We Are So Fragile", "Everyday I Die", "Conversation", "Remember I Was Vapour", "On Broadway", "Down in the Park", "My Shadow in Vain", "Are 'Friends' Electric?", and "Tracks". The concert itself was preceded on the original cassette by the promo video for "Cars". In 2009, The Touring Principle '79 was released on DVD with the same track listing and with the video effects removed (although the original video version with the effects is included as a bonus feature). The DVD does not feature the "Cars" video although it does include a 34-minute interview with Numan in 2009, recalling his memories of the original 1979 tour.

Notes

References
 
 LIVING ORNAMENTS 79 LP numanme.co.uk
Paul Goodwin (2004). Electric Pioneer: An Armchair Guide To Gary Numan

1981 live albums
Gary Numan live albums
Beggars Banquet Records live albums
Albums recorded at the Hammersmith Apollo